Gibson County is a county located in the U.S. state of Tennessee. As of the 2020 census, the population was 50,429. Its county seat is Trenton. The county was formed in 1823 and named for John H. Gibson, a soldier of the Natchez Expedition and the Creek War.

History

Gibson County is located in what was known as "Indian Land": territory that was legally occupied by Chickasaw Native American people.  The Chickasaw Cession, proclaimed on January 7, 1819, eliminated those rights and opened the region to settlement and exploitation by white settlers and speculators.

Soon after the Chickasaw Cession, the first log cabin in what was to become Gibson County had been built by Thomas Fite about eight miles (13 km) east of present-day Trenton.
From 1819 the area was part of Carroll County but, as settlement progressed, citizens petitioned for the formation of a new county.  The county was established by private act on October 21, 1823, and was named in honor of Colonel John H. Gibson who had died earlier that year.  Gibson was a native of Bedford County, Tennessee who was commissioned Lieutenant in the Tennessee Militia; he took part in the War of 1812, the campaign to Natchez of 1813, and fought in the Creek Wars of 1813.

In its early years, Gibson County grew rapidly, chiefly because the land had less dense forest growth than some adjacent areas and was therefore more easily prepared to farm cotton and corn. By the end of 1824, the county had  of taxable land.  The county's first cotton gin was built in 1826.

Geography

Adjacent counties
Weakley County (northeast)
Carroll County (east)
Madison County (south)
Crockett County (southwest)
Dyer County (west)
Obion County (northwest)

State protected areas
Horns Bluff Refuge (part)
Maness Swamp Refuge
Obion River Wildlife Management Area (part)
Tigrett Wildlife Management Area (part)

Demographics

2020 census

As of the 2020 United States census, there were 50,429 people, 19,320 households, and 12,987 families residing in the county.

2000 census
As of the census of 2000, there were 48,152 people, 19,518 households, and 13,584 families residing in the county.  The population density was 80 people per square mile (31/km2).  There were 21,059 housing units at an average density of 35 per square mile (13/km2).  The racial makeup of the county was 78.66% White, 19.72% Black or African American, 0.20% Native American, 0.14% Asian, 0.02% Pacific Islander, 0.50% from other races, and 0.76% from two or more races.  1.12% of the population were Hispanic or Latino of any race.

There were 19,518 households, out of which 30.20% had children under the age of 18 living with them, 52.20% were married couples living together, 13.60% had a female householder with no husband present, and 30.40% were non-families. 27.40% of all households were made up of individuals, and 13.70% had someone living alone who was 65 years of age or older.  The average household size was 2.41 and the average family size was 2.93.

In the county, the population was spread out, with 24.00% under the age of 18, 8.10% from 18 to 24, 26.90% from 25 to 44, 23.30% from 45 to 64, and 17.70% who were 65 years of age or older.  The median age was 39 years. For every 100 females there were 89.50 males.  For every 100 females age 18 and over, there were 85.80 males.

The median income for a household in the county was $31,105, and the median income for a family was $39,318. Males had a median income of $30,360 versus $21,351 for females. The per capita income for the county was $16,320.  About 9.40% of families and 12.80% of the population were below the poverty line, including 17.00% of those under age 18 and 15.30% of those age 65 or over.

Transportation

Airports
There are two airports located in Gibson County:
 Humboldt Municipal Airport (M53), which is owned by City of Humboldt.
 Gibson County Airport (TGC), located midway between Trenton and Milan and owned by City of Milan and Gibson Co.

Court System
Trenton is the county seat. However, since just after the Civil War, Gibson County's court system has been geographically divided, with both Trenton and Humboldt serving as venues for the county's civil and criminal cases.

Education
Gibson County has five special school districts: Bradford, Gibson County, Humboldt, Milan and Trenton. Each district has its own school board and director of schools. There are six high schools in the county.

High schools

Media

Radio stations
Victory 93.7 - The Victory 93.7 FM—WTKB ATWOOD-MILAN
WJPJ AM 1190 & 99.9 "WJPJ Fox Sports Jackson 1190AM/99.9FM"

Newspapers
Tennessee Magnet Publications (free monthly), based in Huntingdon, but circulates in Gibson and Dyer counties
The Tri-City Reporter, Dyer
The Gazette, Trenton
The Chronicle, Humboldt
The Mirror-Exchange, Milan

Events
The Gibson County Fair is held each August in Trenton. The fair is billed as the "oldest continuously running fair in the South." The fair was first held in 1856 and has been held annually since 1869.

Beginning early in 1981, John W. Melton, administrator of the Gibson County General Hospital developed the idea of a “teapot festival;” to draw attention on the rare collection of Porcelain Veilleuses. The festival has grown into a week long event beginning with a ceremonial Lighting of the Teapots and culminates in the Annual Grand Parade.The Teapot Festival begins with the lighting of the teapots ceremony at City Hall.  Music and fireworks show highlight the first evening of the festival.  Other highlights include a parade and the chocolate extravaganza.  Tennis and softball tournaments, along with other athletic competitions, are featured each day during the festival. An arts & crafts show, antique car exhibition, fireworks, display and street dance highlight the final day of the event.  The teapots may be viewed all year round, 7 days a week, 24 hours a day.

The West Tennessee Strawberry Festival had been held annually during the first full week of May in Humboldt since 1934. The festival has drawn up to 100,000 people from across the area. Popular festival events include Thursday's traditional Jr. Parade, which is one of the world's largest non-motorized parades, Friday's Grand Floats Parade, the Horse Show, Governor's Luncheon, Carnival, Prayer Breakfast, Car Show, Berry Idol singing contest, 5K and 10K Runs, Shortcake in the Park, multiple concerts, beauty reviews and more.

Communities

Cities

Dyer
Humboldt (partly in  Madison County)
Medina
Milan
Trenton (county seat)
Yorkville

Towns

Bradford
Gibson
Kenton (partly in Obion County)
Rutherford

Unincorporated communities

 Brazil
 Eaton
 Frog Jump
 Graball
 Hopewell
 Idlewild
 Skullbone

Politics
Gibson County has voted for the Republican in the last five presidential elections. The last Democrat to carry this county was Al Gore in 2000.

Notable natives
Doug Atkins, Hall of Fame NFL football player
Wallace Wade, football coach
Avery Williamson, NFL linebacker

See also
National Register of Historic Places listings in Gibson County, Tennessee

References
Specific

General
 http://www.wbbjtv.com/2016/10/21/former-gibson-co-sheriff-chuck-arnold-pleads-guilty-avoids-prison-time/

External links

 
1823 establishments in Tennessee
Populated places established in 1823
West Tennessee